Muhammad Isman Thoyib (born August 18, 1984 in Indonesia) is an Indonesian professional basketball player. He plays for DELL Aspac Jakarta of the Indonesian basketball league.  He is also a member of the Indonesia national basketball team.

Thoyib competed for the Indonesia national basketball team at the FIBA Asia Championship 2009 for the first time.  He averaged 2.6 points and 5.8 rebounds per game for the team.

References

1984 births
Living people
Indonesian men's basketball players
Centers (basketball)
Power forwards (basketball)
ASEAN Basketball League players
Southeast Asian Games medalists in basketball
Southeast Asian Games silver medalists for Indonesia
Competitors at the 2007 Southeast Asian Games